The English women's cricket team toured New Zealand in November 2000. They played New Zealand in 3 One Day Internationals, with New Zealand winning all three matches. The tour preceded the 2000 Women's Cricket World Cup, which began later that month, also in New Zealand.

Squads

Tour Matches

50-over match: Canterbury v England

WODI Series

1st ODI

2nd ODI

3rd ODI

References

External links
England Women in New Zealand Women's ODI Series 2000/01 from Cricinfo

International cricket competitions in 2000
New Zealand
Women's international cricket tours of New Zealand
2000 in women's cricket